Dubovaya is a rural locality (a village) in Chaykovsky, Perm Krai, Russia. The population was 77 as of 2010. There are 17 streets.

Geography 
Dubovaya is located 19 km south of Chaykovsky. Markovo is the nearest rural locality.

References 

Rural localities in Chaykovsky urban okrug